Glenn Evans Derby, Jr. (born June 27, 1964) is a former American football offensive lineman in the National Football League. He played three seasons for the New Orleans Saints (1988–1990) as a tackle, guard and center. He went to Green Bay Packers as a free agent and left after injury in 1991. He played at the collegiate level at the University of Wisconsin–Madison.

Derby is the brother of former NFL player John Derby. His nephew, A. J. Derby, a tight end, played for the New England Patriots and the Denver Broncos and is now with the Miami Dolphins.

See also
List of New Orleans Saints players

References

1964 births
Living people
People from Oconomowoc, Wisconsin
Players of American football from Wisconsin
American football offensive tackles
American football offensive guards
Wisconsin Badgers football players
New Orleans Saints players
Sportspeople from the Milwaukee metropolitan area